The Path of Death (German: Der Weg des Todes) is a 1917 German silent drama film directed by Robert Reinert and starring Maria Carmi, Carl de Vogt and Conrad Veidt. It marked the screen debut of Veidt. The film was shot in late 1916, but released the following year. It is a 
lost film.

The film's sets were designed by the art director Robert A. Dietrich.

Cast
 Maria Carmi as Gräfin Marie 
 Carl de Vogt as Graf 
 Conrad Veidt as Rolf

References

Bibliography
 Bock, Hans-Michael & Bergfelder, Tim. The Concise CineGraph. Encyclopedia of German Cinema. Berghahn Books, 2009.

External links

1917 films
Films of the German Empire
German silent feature films
Films directed by Robert Reinert
German black-and-white films
1917 drama films
German drama films
Silent drama films
1910s German films
1910s German-language films